Novo Selo is a village in the municipality of Surdulica, Serbia. According to the 2002 census the village has a population of 211 people.

References

Populated places in Pčinja District